Joachim Dietrich Brandis (also Dietrich Joachim Friedrich Brandis) (born 18 March 1762 in Hildesheim, died 28 April 1845 in Copenhagen) was a German-Danish physician.

Family

He was a son of the judge Christian Dietrich Brandis (1722–1800), and belonged to a prominent family from Hildesheim. He was the father of the philosopher Christian August Brandis and the grandfather of the forestry academic and administrator in India Sir Dietrich Brandis.

Career

He studied medicine in Göttingen, earned a doctorate in 1785 and a Habilitation in Brunswick in 1791. In the following years he practised as a physician in the Duchy of Brunswick-Lüneburg. In 1803 he became Professor of Medicine at the University of Kiel, and in 1807 he founded a hospital in Kiel.

After saving the life of the wife of the Danish statesman Christian von Bernstorff, he earned great authority and respect at the Danish royal court, and moved permanently to Copenhagen in 1810. In Denmark he became personal physician to Queen Marie of Denmark and Norway, and he also lectured at the University of Copenhagen. He received the title Etatsraad (Councillor of State) in 1811 and the title Konferensraad (Privy Councillor) in 1828. He also became a member of the Royal Danish Academy of Sciences and Letters in 1819 and of the Royal Swedish Academy of Sciences in 1831.

Works 
 Bibliothecæ medicinæ practicæ: qua scripta ad partem medicinæ practicam; 1776, with Albrecht von Haller and Tribolet
 Joachimi Diederici Brandis ... Commentatio de oleorum unguinosorum natura, etc; 1785
 Translation: Versuch einer Naturgeschichte von Chili: Mit einer Landcharte; 1786, by Johann Ignatz Molina
 Bemerkungen auf einer Reise durch die Pfälzischen und Zweybrückschen Quecksilber-Bergwerke; 1788, with Franz Cölestin von Beroldingen
 Anleitung zum Gebrauche des Driburger Bades und Brunnens nebst einer kurzen Beschreibung der dortigen Anlagen und Gegend; 1792
 Chirurgische und physiologische Versuche; 1795, with John Abernethy and Karl Gottlob Kühn
 Johann Abernetty's Chirurgische und physiologische Versuche: Uebers. und mit einigen Anm. begleitet von Joachim Diterich Brandis; 1795
 Versuche über die Lebenskraft 1795
 Versuche über die Metastasen
 Erfahrungen über die Wirkung der Eisenmittel im allgemeinen und des Driburger Wassers insbesondere; 1803
 Pathologie; 1808
 Pathologie oder Lehre von den Affekten des lebendigen Organismus, 1815
 Ueber psychische Heilmittel und Magnetismus; 1818 (Online)
 Erfahrungen über die Anwendung der Kälte in Krankheiten; 1833 (nicht frei von aprioristischer Ueberschwänglichkeit)
 Zoonomie oder Gesetze des organischen Lebens: Welcher die Artikel des Arzneyvorraths und eine Untersuchung über die Würkung der Arzneymittel enthält; 1801, with Erasmus Darwin
 Ueber humanes Leben; 1825
 Ueber den Unterschied zwischen epidemischen und ansteckenden Fiebern; 1831
 Ueber Leben und Polarität; 1836
 Nosologie und Therapie der Cachexien; 1839

References 

18th-century German physicians
19th-century Danish physicians
Members of the Royal Danish Academy of Sciences and Letters
Members of the Royal Swedish Academy of Sciences
1762 births
1846 deaths
Members of the Göttingen Academy of Sciences and Humanities